The Human Bed is a live album by Back Door, released on 3 June 2002 by Hux Records and compiled from three sessions for BBC Radio 1. It takes its name from the composition "The Human Bed", first released on 1972's Back Door. The album, made between 1 March 1973 and 12 May 1974 at the BBC, includes four previously unreleased tracks.

Track listing

Personnel
Adapted from The Human Bed liner notes.

Back Door
 Ron Aspery –  alto saxophone, soprano saxophone, electric piano (7, 8, 11), arrangement (14)
 Tony Hicks – drums
 Colin Hodgkinson – bass guitar, vocals, twelve-string guitar (12), arrangement (14)
 Dave MacRae - Electric piano (on tracks 10-14)

Production and additional personnel
 Bill Aitken – engineering
 Jeff Griffin – production (6–9)
 Russell Pay – mastering
 Michael Putland – photography
 Pete Ritzema – production (1–5)
 Tony Wilson – production (10–14)

Release history

References

External links 
 The Human Bed at Discogs (list of releases)

2002 compilation albums
Back Door (jazz trio) albums
Hux Records albums
Albums produced by Tony Wilson